Conciliation Resources is an independent organization working with people in conflict to prevent violence and build peace, providing advice, support, and practical resources. It also takes the lessons learned to government decision-makers and others working to end the conflict to improve peacebuilding policies and practice worldwide.

History

Conciliation Resources was established in 1994 by Andy Carl and David Lord, supported by a group of advisors and volunteers. Its earliest project work began in Fiji in 1995 with the newly formed Citizen’s Constitutional Forum. As news of its launch spread to a wider audience, its connections and range of work increased. Soon the NGO started working also in the midst of the war in Sierra Leone and Liberia with local intermediaries and journalists reporting on the conflicts. Currently, Conciliation Resources works with partners in the South Caucasus, East and Central Africa, Southeast Asia (the Philippines), South Asia (Jammu and Kashmir), Pacific (Fiji and Bougainville, an autonomous region in Papua New Guinea), Latin America (Colombia), the Horn of Africa (Kenya and the Ogaden region of Ethiopia - also known as Somali Regional State) and West Africa (Mano River Union and Nigeria).

Accord

Described by Johan Galtung as an "indispensable source", Accord is a series of publications that "informs and strengthens peace processes by documenting and analysing practical lessons and innovations of peacebuilding". Its first edition was released in 1996, documenting the Liberian peace process from 1990 to 1996 and exploring why "13 separate peace accords collapsed in half as many years". A representative of the International Negotiations Network in Liberia, Dayle Spencer, praised the first publication as "useful to scholars and policymakers". Since then, Conciliation Resources has published another 25 editions addressing specific conflicts in countries such as Colombia, Lebanon, Northern Uganda, Somalia, Sudan and Indonesia, and peacebuilding themes such as “cross-border peacebuilding”, “engaging armed groups” or “public participation”, with articles written by a wide range of experts. The most recent edition, called Legitimacy and Peace Processes, was released in April 2014. It analyses issues related to governance, inclusivity and political transition using case studies like Nepal, Burma, Brazil and Yemen.

ICG in Mindanao

"The parties expressed their appreciation to President Aquino for his commitment to a just and lasting peace in Mindanao (...) They also extended their gratitude to the members of the International Contact Group, namely Japan, The Kingdom of Saudi Arabia, Republic of Turkey, the United Kingdom, Centre for Humanitarian Dialogue (HD), Conciliation Resources, Muhammadiyah, and The Asia Foundation (TAF)."

Composed of four states and four international NGOS, the International Contact Group (ICG) was established in 2009 by the Government of the Philippines and the Moro Islamic Liberation Front (MILF). On 15 October 2012, after four decades of armed conflict and 15 years of negotiations, the parties signed a framework peace agreement.  It is the first-ever hybrid ICG and its functions are: attend and observe negotiations on the invitation of the parties and facilitator; provide discreet advice; provide expert assistance on specific issues; meet any of the parties upon request to help resolve substantive issues; and INGOs were additionally requested to "act as a bridge between parties, ICG, facilitator, and local partners in support of the peace process".

Conciliation Resources' involvement in Mindanao dates back to 1999 when it documented its peace process in the Accord publication, Compromising on Autonomy  and its approach is framed by a commitment to women empowerment.

Fiji
Conciliation Resources’ involvement in Fiji dates back to 1995, when it began working with the newly formed national group the Citizens’ Constitutional Forum (CCF). In recent years, the NGO has expanded its work to support other partners, including the Pacific Centre for Peacebuilding and Dialogue Fiji. It has contributed to a gradual shift in attitude towards dialogue as a means of resolving conflict, along with a greater understanding and acceptance of human rights, good governance and multiculturalism in Fiji.   Furthermore, in supporting dialogue initiatives in Fiji, Conciliation Resources has helped build relationships between different ethnic and political groups, both at local and national level.

In August 2013, the Reverend Akuila Yabaki, Chief Executive Officer of CCF, on the partners in the region, received a sentence of three months imprisonment, suspended for twelve months, concerning the reprinting of an article quoting a 2011 report by the UK Law Society Charity, Fiji: The Rule of Law Lost, in which questions were raised over the impartiality of Fiji's judiciary. Responding to this sentence, Conciliation Resources expressed concern that the legal action could serve to curtail public debate and freedom of expression in the Pacific nation, whose government, at that moment, still had to announce a new constitution, replacing the one they abrogated in 2009.

Mano River Union
Since 2007, Conciliation Resources has been working with partner NGOs in the Mano River Union countries of Liberia, Sierra Leone and Guinea to facilitate dialogue between communities in the border regions and their governments to achieve improved governance, accountability and transparency. These countries in particular are linked not only by their common borders and ethnic groups but also by their history and conflicts, and Conciliation Resources’ work aim to improve the rights and needs of border communities. Lessons learnt from this work confirmed that many of the underlying causes which led to conflicts still present a number of serious challenges to the consolidation of peace in the region. Published in 2012, the Accord 23, Consolidating peace in Liberia and Sierra Leone, was focused on the Mano River Union.

Funding

Conciliation Resources receives funding support from a wide range of donors and publishes its latest audited accounts, in accordance with UK Charity Commission Regulations, on its website.

Board of trustees

Conciliation Resources’ board of trustees is composed of the following members: Diana Good, Jamille Jinnah, Liz Muir, Dorothee Hutter, Lucy Moore, Christine Cheng, Nesta Hatendi, Jo Kemp, George Graham, Tayyiba Bajwa, Andrew Peck.

References 

Organisations based in London
Peace organisations based in the United Kingdom
Dispute resolution